Denial, in ordinary English usage, has at least three meanings: asserting that any particular statement or allegation is not true (which might be accurate or inaccurate); the refusal of a request; and asserting that a true statement is not true.

In psychology, denialism is a person's choice to deny reality as a way to avoid a psychologically uncomfortable truth.

In psychoanalytic theory, denial is a defense mechanism in which a person is faced with a fact that is too uncomfortable to accept and rejects it instead, insisting that it is not true despite what may be overwhelming evidence. The concept of denial is important in twelve-step programs where the abandonment or reversal of denial that substance dependence is problematic forms the basis of the first, fourth, fifth, eighth and tenth steps.

People who are exhibiting symptoms of a serious medical condition sometimes deny or ignore those symptoms because the idea of having a serious health problem is uncomfortable or disturbing. The American Heart Association cites denial as a principal reason that treatment of a heart attack is delayed.  Because the symptoms are so varied, and often have other potential explanations, the opportunity exists for the patient to deny the emergency, often with fatal consequences.  It is common for patients to delay recommended mammograms or other tests because of a fear of cancer, even though on average this worsens the long-term medical outcome.

Psychology 
Initial short-term denial can be a good thing, giving time to adjust to a painful or stressful issue. It might also be a precursor to making some sort of change in one's life. But denial can also be harmful; if denial persists and prevents a person from taking appropriate action, it's a harmful response.

In political and economic context 
Some people who are known as denialists or true believers have been known to be in denial of historical or scientific facts accepted by the mainstream of society or by experts, for political or economic reasons. Examples of denialism include:

Climate change denial
Denial of evolution
Historical negationism (such as Holocaust denial)
HIV/AIDS denialism
Modern flat Earth societies

See also

References

Further reading

Articles 
 
 
 
 

Cognitive biases
Belief
Dissent

eo:Abnegacio